The 2015–16 season was Derby County's eighth consecutive season in the Championship in their 132nd year in existence. Along with competing in the Championship, the club also participated in the FA Cup and League Cup. The season covers the period from 1 July 2015 to 30 June 2016.

Transfers

Transfers in

Total spending:  £24,250,000

Transfers out

Loans out

Competitions

Pre-season friendlies
On 19 May 2015, Derby County announced Benfica would visit as part of their pre-season schedule. Also the club confirmed they would head to Netherlands for a week. Derby County will also play a number of friendlies in England. On 24 May, Derby County confirmed the pre-season match against Benfica originally scheduled has been cancelled due to the Portuguese club being involved in the 2015 International Champions Cup. On 16 June 2015, Derby County announced pre-season friendlies against Nuneaton Town and Alfreton Town have been cancelled and replaced by a trip to Grimsby Town. On 26 June 2015, as part of pre-season preparations Derby County will host Spanish side Villarreal.

Championship

League table

Results by matchday

Matches
On 17 June 2015, the fixtures for the forthcoming season were announced.

FA Cup
On 16 December 2015, it was confirmed that Derby County would be drawn away against League Two side Hartlepool United after they won their second round replay against Salford City.

League Cup
On 16 June 2015, the first round draw was made, Derby County were drawn away against Portsmouth.

Football League play-offs
As a result of Derby County finishing in fifth place in the Championship they qualified for the Football League play-offs. In the play-off semi finals Derby County will play against fourth placed team Hull City over two legs.

Top scorers

Last updated: 18 May 2016

Note: Flags indicate national team as has been defined under FIFA eligibility rules. Players may hold more than one non-FIFA nationality.

References

Derby County
Derby County F.C. seasons